The following is the list of cities in Latvia that underwent a name change in the past.

Stučka → Aizkraukle
Dünaburg → Borisoglebsk → (1656) → Dünaburg (1667) → Dvinsk (1893) → Daugavpils (1920)
Libau → Libava → Liepāja (1917)
Birži → Madona (1920)
Windau → Ventspils (parallel use until the 1920s)
Wenden → Cēsis (parallel use until the 1920s)
Schrunden → Skrunda (parallel use until the 1920s)
Stukmaņi → Pļaviņas (parallel use until the 1920s)
Sasmaka → Valdemārpils (1926)
Haynasch → Ainaži (1917)
Marienburg → Alūksne (~1750)
Vecauce → Auce (1924)
Mitau → Mītava → Jelgava (~1860)
Wolmar → Valmiera (parallel use until the 1920s)
Jakobstadt → Jēkabpils (parallel use until the 1920s)
Goldingen → Kuldīga (parallel use until the 1920s)
Neibāde → Saulkrasti (until 1931)
Lemesele → Lemsal → Limbaži (until 1931)

See also
List of cities and towns in East Prussia
List of renamed cities in Estonia
List of renamed cities in Lithuania

Geographic history of Latvia
Latvia geography-related lists
Latvia history-related lists
Latvia, renamed
Renamed, Latvia
Latvia